Curtin Radio is a radio station based in Perth. The station broadcasts from studios at the Bentley campus at Curtin University. As well as broadcasting on radio, the station also broadcasts digitally on CurtinDG as well as live-streaming via their website.

History
The station was formerly known as Curtin Radio 927, and became the state's first community broadcaster on 16 October 1976. The station held one of only five special licences granted by the then Minister for the Media, Moss Cass, after he 'discovered' community radio in the United States. Curtin Radio is still officially known as 6NR (6 New Radio), and the Western Australian Institute of Technology (WAIT), now Curtin University, continues to hold the licence.

After 26 years of AM broadcasting, the station converted to the FM Band in 2002. The radio station is available on the DAB+ format (digital radio) as CURTINDG and is also available on the World Wide Web, and streaming services such as iHeartRadio.

According to their website, Curtin Radio has a weekly cumulative listenership in excess of 239,000 people (all ages 15+) and has more than four thousand subscribing members. Curtin Radio also has more than 100 on-air & production volunteers.

Presenters and Shows

Volunteer presenters and producers broadcast during the evenings and weekends.

Newsroom
A training ground for students who study at the Curtin School of Journalism, Curtin Radio has assisted with producing some of Western Australia's most respected radio and television journalists.

The Curtin Radio Newsroom is staffed by two full-time journalists, Courtney Thornton and Ruby Devlin. It is also occasionally staffed by volunteer students, who study at the Curtin School of Journalism and prepare news bulletins.

The station has news updates from 6AM to 6PM each weekday and 6AM to Midday on weekends.

References

External links
 Curtin Radio Official Website

Curtin University
Student radio stations in Australia
Oldies radio stations in Australia
Radio stations established in 1976
Radio stations in Perth, Western Australia